The New America is the eleventh studio album by punk band Bad Religion. It was released in 2000 and is their last album (to date) on Atlantic Records.

The New America is also Bad Religion's last album with Bobby Schayer on drums. Though not yet credited as a member of the band, then-former and now-current guitarist Brett Gurewitz co-wrote and played guitar on the song "Believe It". The album was re-released by Epitaph Records on September 15, 2008. Like its predecessor, none of the album's songs would develop into live staples; only the title track is performed live occasionally.

Musical style and lyrics

The album was initially titled The Last Word, before being changed to The New America as a large number of people thought the band was breaking up. The album marks a departure for the band, as some of the songs are personal, rather than political in nature, and more optimism is employed. Topics range from singer Greg Graffin's recent divorce to his past growing up as a punk kid in the early '80s. Apart from Brett Gurewtiz's guest contribution, it is the only Bad Religion album solely written by Graffin.

Production

The New America was recorded from October to December 1999 at Victor's Barn, Kauai, Hawaii and produced by Todd Rundgren. Rundgren had been one of the musicians Greg Graffin looked up to while growing up. However, working with Rundgren proved to be a disappointment to the band and especially Graffin, because they did not get along well with each other. Graffin however would later write in his book, Anarchy Evolution, that although Todd Rundgren was difficult to work with, they remain friends to this day.

Release
The New America was released on May 9, 2000 and is the last Bad Religion album distributed via Atlantic Records to date. The release of The New America marked the band's fulfillment of their four-album contract with Atlantic Records, allowing the band to reconvene with former band-mate, Brett Gurewitz, for their next album, 2002's The Process of Belief, released on Epitaph Records. Shortly after the album's release, a music video was made for "The New America", which features two children playing with action figures of the band. The band promoted it with a supporting slot for Blink-182, and appeared on The Late Late Show with Craig Kilborn and Core Culture. In March 2001, the band toured South America, supporting Biohazard for two of the shows.

Reception

The New America peaked at number 88 on the Billboard 200 album chart.

Track listing

Personnel
 Greg Graffin – lead vocals
 Greg Hetson – guitar
 Brian Baker – guitar, backing vocals
 Jay Bentley – bass guitar, backing vocals
 Bobby Schayer – drums, percussion
Brett Gurewitz – Lead guitar on "Believe It" (Uncredited as a member of the band. Credited as "Mr. Brett")
 Todd Rundgren – producer, backing vocals
 David Boucher – mixing
 Bob Clearmountain – mixing
 Christina Dittmar – design
 Olaf Heine – photography

References

External links

The New Americas at YouTube (streamed copy where licensed)

Bad Religion albums
2000 albums
Atlantic Records albums
Albums produced by Todd Rundgren
Pop punk albums by American artists